Sir Nathaniel Bacon (died 7 November 1622), of Stiffkey in Norfolk, was an English lawyer and Member of Parliament (MP).

Life
Nathaniel Bacon was the second son of Sir Nicholas Bacon, full brother of Elizabeth Bacon, and half-brother of Sir Francis Bacon and Anthony Bacon. Educated at Trinity College, Cambridge, he was admitted to Gray's Inn in 1562, and became an "ancient" of the Inn in 1576. He was MP for Tavistock (1571–1583), Norfolk (1584–1585, 1593 and 1604–1611, and defeated there in 1601) and King's Lynn (1597–1598); a Puritan, he was an occasionally vocal member of their parliamentary faction during Elizabeth's reign. He also served as High Sheriff of Norfolk in 1586 and 1599, and was knighted in 1604.

Bacon's will, written in 1614, mentions the construction of his tomb at Stiffkey, and a jewel with a unicorn horn, which his three daughters were to use as a medicinal charm.

Bacon was married twice. He had three daughters by his first wife, Anne Gresham, daughter of Thomas Gresham; his eldest daughter and a co heir, Anne Bacon, married Sir John Townshend.

His second wife was Dorothy Hopton, who inherited the manor of Eccles from her husband.

Notes

References
 Mentioned at the end of article on the father.

High Sheriffs of Norfolk
1622 deaths
English MPs 1572–1583
Year of birth missing
Alumni of Trinity College, Cambridge
Members of Gray's Inn
English MPs 1584–1585
English MPs 1593
English MPs 1597–1598
English MPs 1604–1611
Nathaniel
People from Stiffkey
English knights
Members of Parliament for Norfolk
Members of the Parliament of England for Tavistock